Lake Harbor is a census-designated place (CDP) in Palm Beach County, Florida, United States. The population was 49 at the 2020 census. It located along the southern banks of Lake Okeechobee, at the beginning of the Miami Canal. John Stretch Park is also located alongside the north end of Lake Harbor and the lake.

Geography
Lake Harbor is located at  (26.686985, -80.807613).

According to the United States Census Bureau, the CDP has a total area of 3.4 km2 (1.3 mi2), all land. The community is centered at the intersection of Mutt-Thomas road and U.S. Route 27 (which runs concurrently with Florida State Road 80).

Demographics

As of the census of 2000, there were 195 people, 65 households, and 44 families residing in the CDP.  The population density was 57.5/km2 (148.7/mi2).  There were 118 housing units at an average density of 34.8/km2 (90.0/mi2).  The racial makeup of the CDP was 41.54% White (35.9% were Non-Hispanic White,) 42.56% African American, 3.08% Asian, 2.05% from other races, and 10.77% from two or more races. Hispanic or Latino of any race were 6.67% of the population.

There were 65 households, out of which 32.3% had children under the age of 18 living with them, 50.8% were married couples living together, 12.3% had a female householder with no husband present, and 32.3% were non-families. 24.6% of all households were made up of individuals, and 4.6% had someone living alone who was 65 years of age or older.  The average household size was 3.00 and the average family size was 3.55.

In the CDP, the population was spread out, with 29.2% under the age of 18, 5.1% from 18 to 24, 32.8% from 25 to 44, 22.6% from 45 to 64, and 10.3% who were 65 years of age or older.  The median age was 39 years. For every 100 females, there were 105.3 males.  For every 100 females age 18 and over, there were 106.0 males.

The median income for a household in the CDP was $35,208, and the median income for a family was $31,250. Males had a median income of $36,458 versus $16,250 for females. The per capita income for the CDP was $12,977.  None of the families and 9.7% of the population were living below the poverty line.

As of 2000, English was the first language for 100% of the population, however, only 25 people out of 195 residents answered the 2000 U.S. Census' language section.

Politics 
Lake Harbor is generally though not reliably supportive of the Republican Party, as a voting region which included all of Lake Harbor voted in favor of Donald Trump by 29 percentage points during the 2020 United States presidential election over Joe Biden. Lake Harbor had previously voted in favor of Hillary Clinton during the 2016 election.

Education 
Lake Harbor has no schools of its own; the community is grouped within the School District of Palm Beach County, though the community is just over equidistant from the Henry County Schools' Clewiston High School compared to Palm Beach County's Glades Central High School. Numerous charter and private schools are also located in the area, the largest of which being Glades Day School, and through Belle Glade, Lake Harbor additionally is within driving distance of numerous satellite university campuses and specialty education centers.

Transportation 
Lake Harbor has limited access to outside regions by road, and the primary road links Lake Harbor are U.S. Route 27 and Florida State Road 80. Lake Harbor, however, is directly on the Okeechobee Waterway, enabling connections to multiple other regions of Lake Okeechobee and its maritime links.

Commercial air transport to Lake Harbor is limited, and the closest airport with commercial service to Lake Harbor is Palm Beach International Airport at about 50 miles away. Residents can also elect to utilize Fort Lauderdale–Hollywood International Airport or Southwest Florida International Airport, both of which are less than 80 miles away from Lake Harbor. General aviation has a much closer link to Lake Harbor, as Belle Glade State Municipal Airport is located less than ten miles away from the town.

References

Census-designated places in Palm Beach County, Florida
Census-designated places in Florida
Populated places on Lake Okeechobee